Azteca aragua is a species of ant in the genus Azteca. Described by Longino in 1991, the species is widespread in Venezuela.

References

Azteca (genus)
Hymenoptera of South America
Insects described in 1991